Karim Mamdouh Khaled (born on 3 March 1993) is an Egyptian footballer who currently plays in the Egyptian Premier League club Tala'ea El Gaish SC on loan from Al Ittihad as a defender or midfielder.

International career
Mamdouh made his first international appearance with the senior national team on 29 January 2016, in a home game against Libya (2–0), after he came on as a substitute for Mahmoud Kahraba in the 68th minute of that game.

References

External links
 
 

Living people
Egyptian footballers
Egypt international footballers
Wadi Degla SC players
Misr Lel Makkasa SC players
Al Ittihad Alexandria Club players
Tala'ea El Gaish SC players
1993 births
Egyptian Premier League players
Association football midfielders
Association football defenders